Glyptotermes is a genus of termite in the family Kalotermitidae. With 127 species worldwide as of 2013, is the family's most speciose genus, and the second most speciose in the New World after Cryptotermes. 

Entomologist Rudolf H. Scheffrahn argued in 2018 that the paucity of Glyptotermes records from throughout much of the Caribbean Basin and South America was caused by a field sampling bias toward non-kalotermitids. The first records of this genus from Bolivia, Colombia, Ecuador, French Guiana, Guatemala, Honduras, Paraguay, Peru, and much of the Lesser Antilles were provided by Scheffrahn in 2019.

Glyptotermes species have a rather high wood moisture requirement and, therefore, are not found in arid parts of the Neotropics and are likewise, not economically important. Although the imago morphology is quite conserved, the head capsules of Glyptotermes soldiers are variously adorned with protuberances and rugosities, and robust mandibles that facilitate their identification.

Selected species 
 Glyptotermes canellae (Müller, 1873)
Glyptotermes ceylonicus Holmgren, 1911
 Glyptotermes chiraharitae Amina & Rajmohana, 2016
Glyptotermes dilatatus (Bugnion & Popoff, 1910)
 Glyptotermes hickmani Rudolf H. Scheffrahn, 2021
Glyptotermes minutus Kemner, 1932

References 

Termite genera
Glyptotermes